Wayne Marshall  (born January 7, 1986) is an American professional basketball player for Shinshu Brave Warriors in Japan.

Career statistics 

|-
| align="left" | 2011-12
| align="left" | Osaka
| 48|| || 29.3|| .456|| .429|| .626|| 6.9|| 1.6|| 0.7|| 1.6||  11.2
|-
| align="left" | 2012-13
| align="left" | Shinshu
| 24|| || 25.9|| .533|| .500|| .769|| 7.3|| 1.1|| 0.8|| 2.0||  14.6
|-
| align="left" | 2013-14
| align="left" | Yokohama
| 48|| || 22.8|| .485|| .000|| .566|| 5.1|| 1.2|| 0.5|| 1.4||  11.0
|-
| align="left" | 2014-15
| align="left" | Yokohama
| 38|| || 24.8|| .467|| .000|| .637|| 5.9|| 2.1|| 1.0|| 1.0||  11.3
|-
|}

References

1986 births
Living people
American expatriate basketball people in Canada
American expatriate basketball people in Japan
Kanazawa Samuraiz players
Osaka Evessa players
Shinshu Brave Warriors players
Shimane Susanoo Magic players
Yokohama B-Corsairs players
American men's basketball players
Centers (basketball)
Basketball players from Philadelphia
Martin Luther King High School (Philadelphia) alumni